Symphysa is a genus of moths of the family Crambidae.

Species
Symphysa amoenalis 
Symphysa discalis Hampson, 1912
Symphysa lepidaria (Stoll in Cramer & Stoll, 1781)

References

Natural History Museum Lepidoptera genus database

Evergestinae
Crambidae genera